Wiped Out is the second full-length album by British heavy metal band Raven, released in 1982.

Reception
In 2005, Wiped Out was ranked number 495 in Rock Hard magazine's book of The 500 Greatest Rock & Metal Albums of All Time.

Track listing
All songs written by Gallagher, Gallagher, and Hunter.

Personnel 
Raven
John Gallagher – bass, vocals
Mark Gallagher – guitar
Rob Hunter – drums

Production
Keith Nichol – producer, engineer

References

1982 albums
Raven (British band) albums